St Laurence's GAA [CLG Naomh Lorcán] is a Gaelic Athletic Association club in south County Kildare, Ireland.

History
St. Laurence's G.A.A. Gaelic Athletic Association Club, Oldgrange, Narraghmore, Co. Kildare is based in the parish of Narraghmore, encompassing villages of Narraghmore, Kilmead, Booley, Calverstown, Kilgowan, Brewel, Ballymount, Crookstown, Ballitore and Mullaghmast. 
St. Laurence’s G.A.A. club grounds in Oldgrange, Narraghmore were purchased in 1975 and the clubhouse dressing rooms opened in 1992 and 1999 respectively.

St. Laurence's have Senior Men’s Football, Ladies Football, Hurling, Camogie, Basketball, Badminton & Bowls teams at all ages to name but a few.

St. Laurence's also have a Community Complex with Bar, Sports Hall, a safe gated and fenced off Outdoor Playground and a dedicated 0.75kM Walking/Jogging/Running track around our playing pitches.

Gaelic Football [Peil Ghaelach] 
In 2009 St. Laurence's GAA Club won their first ever Kildare Senior Football Championship.

Hurling [Iomáint] 
St. Laurence's GAA has a proud tradition of hurling and started fielding hurling teams at Underage in 1998. This has continued up to the modern day and St. Laurence's GAA Hurling Club consistently provide players to the Kildare Development Squads. In 2017 St. Laurence's GAA Hurling Club had two representatives on the Kildare Under 17 Celtic Challenge Team.

In 2005 St. Laurence's GAA Hurling Club fielded its first ever Adult Team and this team would go on to win a Kildare Adult Hurling League Title in 2008. St. Laurence's GAA Hurling Club won the Kildare Junior Hurling Championship in 2011 and followed this up by winning the Kildare Intermediate League in 2012. St. Laurence's GAA Hurling Club has had 3 Players so far go on and represent Kildare at Senior Hurling Level.

St. Laurence's GAA Hurling Club is the only hurling club in South Kildare to field teams at both Underage and Adult Level.

Camogie [Camógaíocht] 
Sheila Norton founded the Ballitore camogie club in March 1934 with the Kilkenny colours, black and amber, and the club were defeated junior finalists in 1940.

Revived in 1980 and using the St. Laurence's colours and name the club won the junior championship and league. The club went on to win the Intermediate championship in 1989, with a victory over Broadford which prevented Broadford from winning 11 in-a-row. Eight of the Laurence's team were under 18 on the day. Two 14-year-olds played on the St. Laurence's team that day also, twins Ruth and Naomi Treacy.

Patricia Keatley, Melanie Treacy and Michelle Aspell and were selected on the Kildare camogie team of the century.

Ladies Gaelic Football [Peil Ghaelach na mBan] 

St. Laurence's Ladies Gaelic Football provides Gaelic football for ladies of all ages in a fun and friendly environment.

Honours
Kildare Minor A Football Champions 1974, 2006
Kildare Junior B Football Championship (1) 1975 (In 1947 Narraghmore were champions)
Kildare Junior Football Championship: (1) 1978
Kildare Intermediate Football Championship: Winners 1980
Kildare Junior Camogie Championship (1) 1980
Kildare Senior Football Championship Finalists 1982, 1992, 2004, 2005, 2009
Kildare Intermediate Camogie Championship (1) 1989
Kildare Minor B Football Champions 1991, 1994, 2000
Kildare Senior Camogie Championship: (15) 1992, 1994, 1995, 1996, 1997, 1998, 1999, 2000, 2001, 2002, 2003, 2004, 2007, 2008, 2009
Kildare U16A  Football Championship 1995, 2004, 2018
Kildare Senior Camogie League  (13) 1996, 1997, 1999, 2000, 2001, 2002, 2003, 2004, 2005, 2006, 2007, 2008, 2009
Leinster Junior Camogie Club Championship (2) 1996, 2004
Kildare Senior Football League Division 1 'Leinster Leader Cup Champions' 2000, 2005, 2009
Kildare U14 Féile Football Champions / All Ireland Silver Medialists 2000
Kildare U21A Football Champions 2004
Kildare Junior C Football Championship 2005
Kildare Ladies Junior C Football Championship 2006
Aldridge Cup 2007
Kildare Senior Club Football Championship: (1) 2009
Kildare Junior Hurling Championship 2011
KWETB Féile Peile na nÓg Boys B Champions 2018
John West Féile Peile na nÓg Boys Div 5 Shield Champions 2018
Kildare U17 Div 1 Summer Football League Winners 2018
Kildare Minor Div 1 Football League Winners 2019

GAA Healthy Club 
At the 2017 AGM St Laurence's GAA nominated the very first ever Healthy Club Officer, Mary Mulryan. The club went from there and applied to officially become a GAA Healthy Club.

On 16 February 2018 St. Laurence's GAA officially got conformation from Croke Park that they were selected to participate in Phase 3 of the GAA's Healthy Club Project.

The GAA Healthy Club project aims to help GAA clubs explore how they support the holistic health of their members and the communities they serve. GAA clubs already contribute to the health and wellbeing of their members by providing opportunities to develop their physical, social, emotional, and psychological health.

The project aims to help GAA clubs identify what they are already doing well, identify areas where they can or would like to improve, and empower them to ensure that everyone who engages with their club benefits from the experience in a health-enhancing way, be they players, officers, coaches, parents, supporters, or members of their local community.

The healthy club model, which is based on best national and international practice, also aims to embed a healthy philosophy in a club while integrating health into the day-to-day club activities in a sustainable way. It also aims to place the local GAA club at the heart of the community, making it a beacon for health in the locale.

Badminton 
St. Laurence's Badminton Club was established in 2006 and offers both Junior and Adult Badminton clubs.

Badminton Ireland is the national governing body for the sport on the island of Ireland.

Badminton Ireland was founded in 1899, took part in the first international badminton match against England in 1903 and was founding member of the World Badminton Federation in 1934.

Today, our sporting proposition is as valid as ever, Badminton is truly a sport for life.

Ireland has one of the largest badminton memberships per capita in the world with deep roots in the local community with over 400 clubs nationwide.

Badminton Ireland  believe that supporting the badminton community is essential and have placed great emphasis on providing excellent support to its members, and as a result they have an increasing membership with over 16,000 registered players in Ireland and an estimated 100,000 playing the game regularly.

Badminton Irelands' high performance centre is based at the Marino campus of Trinity University, Dublin.

Basketball [Cispheile] 
St. Laurence's Basketball Club 'LARRIE BIRDS' was established in 2015.

Basketball Ireland (B.I.) is the national governing body for the sport on the island of Ireland.

Part of FIBA, the World Governing body, B.I. is responsible for the promotion and administration of basketball throughout Ireland and for Irish international participation.

History was made in on Sunday 1 November 2015 with a new Basketball Club 'LARRIE BIRDS' hosting their first ever competitive matches.

Athlone Basketball made the journey to play our U12 & U14 girls teams who were the first teams to represent our club at any grade.

'LARRIE BIRDS' Founding Members: Sinead Ryan, Regina Byrne, Teresa O'Loughlin and Laura Becton.

St. Laurence's Basketball Club aim to grow to make the LARRIE BIRDS a recognised name in Irish basketball.

Indoor Bowls 
St. Laurence's Bowls Club is run out of St. Laurence's Complex Hall every Monday evening from 8-10pm during the Indoor Bowls Season [August - April].

St. Laurence's Bowls Club are always looking for NEW MEMBERS so please do call down any Monday evening should you be interested in learning how to play, whether it be socially or even competitively. St. Laurence's Bowls Club fields a mixed team where all abilities are catered for and all ages welcome.

If you would like more information about the St. Laurence's Bowls Club please just call in any Monday evening from 8-10PM.

St. Laurence's Bowls Club currently competes in the First Division of the Kildare West Wicklow Indoor Bowling Association – KWWIBA league.

Kildare West Wicklow Indoor Bowling Association [KWWIBA]:

KWWIBA has a membership of 31 clubs, 4 in West Wicklow, 26 in Kildare and 1 in Co. Laois.

CLUBS:

Abbey Bowls, Allen, Allenwood, Ardclough, Athy, Ballymore Eustace, Baltinglass/kiltegan, Balyna, Blessington, Brownstown, Caragh, Castlemitchell, Celbridge, Clane/Staplestown, CoillDubh, Donard/Glen, Hollywood, Kilcullen, Kildangan, Kildare, Kill, Kill CBC, Monasterevin, Naas, Prosperous, Rathangan, Rathcoffey, Rathmore, Ryston Newbridge, St. Laurence's and Straffan.

Bibliography
 Kildare GAA: A Centenary History, by Eoghan Corry, CLG Chill Dara, 1984,  hb  pb
 Kildare GAA yearbook, 1972, 1974, 1978, 1979, 1980 and 2000- in sequence especially the Millennium yearbook of 2000
 Soaring Sliothars: Centenary of Kildare Camogie 1904-2004 by Joan O'Flynn Kildare County Camogie Board.
Ní neart go cur le chéile : The history of St Laurence's GAA 1957-2007 by Daragh Ó Conchúir.

External links
 St Laurence’s GAA site
 Kildare GAA site
 Kildare GAA club sites
 http://www.gaa.ie/
 http://www.camogie.ie/
 http://ladiesgaelic.ie/

Gaelic games clubs in County Kildare
Gaelic football clubs in County Kildare